The Journal of Leadership & Organizational Studies is a quarterly peer-reviewed academic journal that covers research in the field of management studies. Its editor-in-chief is Sean Hannah (Wake Forest University). It was established in 1993 and is currently published by SAGE Publications in association with Midwest Academy of Management.

Abstracting and indexing 
The Journal of Leadership & organizational Studies is abstracted and indexed in:
 Business Source Complete
 Business Source Corporate
 Expanded Academic ASAP
 InfoTrac
 PsycINFO
 Scopus

According to the Journal Citation Reports, its 2021 impact factor is 3.611, ranking it 144 out of 226 journals in the category ‘Management’.

References

External links 
 

SAGE Publishing academic journals
English-language journals
Business and management journals
Publications established in 1993
Quarterly journals